Shayden Jermaine Morris (born 3 November 2001) is an English professional footballer who plays as a forward for Aberdeen.

Early life and education
Morris was born in Newham and attended Brampton Manor Academy in East Ham.

Career

Fleetwood Town
After playing youth football for Southend United, Morris joined Fleetwood Town's academy in 2018 on a two-year scholarship. He made his senior debut for Fleetwood Town as a substitute in their 1–1 EFL Trophy draw with Liverpool U21 on 25 September 2019. On 16 July 2020, Morris signed his first professional contract – a one-year contract with the option of a further year. On 15 January 2021, he signed a new contract lasting until summer 2023. He made his league debut for the club on 16 January 2021 in a 1–0 League One defeat at home to Portsmouth. Morris scored his first professional goal in a 3–2 home win over Cheltenham Town on 21 August 2021.

Aberdeen
Morris moved to Scottish club Aberdeen for an undisclosed fee in August 2022.

Career statistics

References

Living people
2001 births
English footballers
Footballers from the London Borough of Newham
Association football forwards
Southend United F.C. players
Fleetwood Town F.C. players
English Football League players
Black British sportspeople
Aberdeen F.C. players
Scottish Professional Football League players